Alana Smith (born November 9, 1999) is an American tennis player.

Smith made her WTA Tour main-draw debut at the 2017 Citi Open in the doubles draw, partnering Skylar Morton.

ITF finals

Doubles: 3 (2 titles, 1 runner–up)

External links
 
 

1999 births
Living people
American female tennis players
21st-century American women
NC State Wolfpack women's tennis players